Renown Park is an inner northern suburb of Adelaide, South Australia. It is located in the City of Charles Sturt.

Geography
The suburb lies between Torrens Road and the Gawler railway line, which form its southwestern and eastern boundaries, respectively, with South Road intersecting the suburb in the east.

History 
The suburb was established in 1920. It emerged from the sale of land belonging to a John McQuillan upon his death. The land was described in an advertisement as "that fine level area just beyond the Ovingham railway-station". The suburb was named in 1920 shortly after the HMS Renown brought the Prince of Wales to Australia.

Demographics

The 2016 Census by the Australian Bureau of Statistics counted 1,697 persons in Renown Park on census night. Of these, 50.4% were male and 49.6% were female.

The majority of residents (54.2%) are of Australian birth, with other common census responses being Vietnam (7.6%), India (4.5%), China (3.8%), England (2.3%), and Greece (1.8). Additionally, people of Aboriginal and/or Torres Strait Islander descent made up 1.4% of the suburb.

In terms of religious affiliation, 30.8% of residents attributed themselves to being irreligious, 19.7% attributed themselves to being Catholic, 8.0% attributed themselves to be Eastern Orthodox, and 6.6% attributed themselves to being Buddhist. Within Renown Park, 87.4% of the residents were employed, with the remaining 12.6% being unemployed.

Community
The local newspaper is the Weekly Times Messenger. Other regional and national newspapers such as The Advertiser and The Australian are also available.

Schools
Brompton Primary School	is located on Napier Street.

Facilities and attractions

Parks

Sam Johnson Sportsground is located between Bolingbroke Avenue and Cavan Avenue, as well as Angus Reserve just off of Angus Court.

Transportation

Roads
Renown Park is serviced by South Road, linking the suburb to the far north and south of Adelaide, and Torrens Road, which connects Renown Park with Adelaide city centre.

Public transport
Renown Park is serviced by public transport run by the Adelaide Metro. The tram line goes to Hindmarsh which is nearby. There were more trams in the early days but they were removed.

Trains
The Gawler railway line passes beside the suburb.  The closest station is Ovingham, on Renown Park's southeastern boundary.

Buses
The suburb is serviced by bus routes run by the Adelaide Metro.

See also
List of Adelaide suburbs

References

The Advertiser, 28 July 1920.

External links

Suburbs of Adelaide